MI13 or variant may refer to:

 Michigan's 13th congressional district
 Michigan's 13th House of Representatives district
 M-13 (Michigan highway)
 MI-13 (comics)
 An unused or classified section of the United Kingdom Directorate of Military Intelligence